Gardineriidae is a family of corals belonging to the order Scleractinia.

Genera:
 Adkinsella Wells, 1933
 Gardineria Vaughan, 1907
 Stolarskicyathus Cairns, 2004

References

  
Scleractinia
Cnidarian families